Daweishan Town is a rural town in Liuyang City, Hunan Province, People's Republic of China. It borders Pingjiang County in the north, Paibu Town of Jiangxi in the east, Zhangfang Town in the south, and Dahu Town in the west and southwest.

History
According to the Total annals of the Qing Dynasty, the name of Daweishan derives from the view of the town shrouded by mountains.

In 1995, the Zhongyue Township and former Daweishan Township merged to form the Daweishan Town.

In 2005, Baisha Township was merged into the town.

Administrative divisions
The town is divided into 10 villages and two communities, the following areas: 
 Dongmen Community
 Baisha Community
 Zhongyue Village
 Tongxing Village
 Zhongduan Village
 Jinzhongqiao Village
 Chudong Village
 Tianxinqiao Village
 Shangping Village
 Liuheyuan Village
 Beiluyuan Village
 Daweishan Village

Geography
The Daxi River flows through the town.

There are a number of popular mountains located immediately adjacent to the townsite which include Mount Qixingling; Mount Baimianshi; Mount Chongtian Lazhu; Mount Lingpai; Mount Diaoshuijian; and Mount Wangpojian.

Economy
The local economy is primarily based upon agriculture and tourism.

Wood, fruit, traditional Chinese medicine and phyllostachys pubescens are important to the economy.

Education
 Daweishan Middle School

Transportation
The County Road X002 passes across the town west to east.

Attractions
A national park is located southeast of the town: Daweishan National Forest Park. Daweishan Rafting is a famous scenic spot.

Other main attractions are the Dongmen Ancient Town, Weishan Academy and Tomb of Tang Shou.

References

External links

2000 Census figures from 

Divisions of Liuyang
Liuyang